Vacherie is an unincorporated community in St. James Parish, Louisiana, United States. It is part of the New Orleans Metropolitan Area . The name of the place derives from the French word for cowshed. On the SW side of the community is the  WZRH/KVDU-Tower, a guyed mast noted as the tallest tower in the state of Louisiana.

The best known location in the community is the Oak Alley Plantation. There are several other historic plantations in the area: Laura, Desire, St. Joseph, and Felicity. The last two were combined in 1890.

Vacherie was used as a filming location for the TV series True Detective.

Census-designated places

 Vacherie is split into two census-designated places, North Vacherie and South Vacherie, by the United States Census Bureau. As of the 2000 census, North Vacherie had a population of 2,462 and South Vacherie had a population of 3,543.

Education
St. James Parish Public Schools operates public schools. St. James High School is located in Vacherie. Vacherie Elementary School in South Vacherie serves the community.

Notable people
George T. Oubre, state senator from 1968 to 1972 from Vacherie; ran for state attorney general against William J. Guste in the 1971 Democratic primary election.
Alfred C. Williams, state representative for East Baton Rouge Parish since 2015; former Vacherie resident
 Avis White, MasterChef season 1 contestant

References

Louisiana populated places on the Mississippi River
Unincorporated communities in Louisiana
New Orleans metropolitan area